Dương Văn Môn was a Vietnamese mass murderer who killed at least 11 people and wounded six others in Krông Pắk District, Đắk Lắk Province, Vietnam on August 8, 1998.

Môn, a member of the Nùng minority, was a poor rice farmer, and was said to have once suffered from an unspecified mental illness. When his mother died he reportedly dug a grave on village property, but was then denied to use it, and therefore had to bury her in his own garden. He also got severely into debt to finance the traditional funeral feast.

On the third day of the festivities, when his guests began to complain that there was not enough to drink and eat, the 35-year-old armed himself with two machete-like knives and began to attack his relatives and neighbours. He first stabbed an elderly woman preparing food in his house, as well as a child, and eventually began chasing people throughout the village, killing a total of eleven people, among them seven children, and leaving six others injured, including his wife. One of the wounded died in hospital, according to early reports. Afterwards he tried to commit suicide by swallowing insecticide, but was forced to vomit it when he was captured by villagers 4 1/2 hours later. He was then arrested by police and brought to a hospital.

Môn was sentenced to death for the murder of eleven people in November 1998.

References

Mass murder in 1998
People convicted of murder by Vietnam
Vietnamese prisoners sentenced to death
Vietnamese people convicted of murder
Vietnamese farmers
Year of birth missing
Mass stabbings
1960s births
Nùng people